Datuk Seri Panglima Dr. Joachim Gunsalam (born 22 January 1958) is a Malaysian politician who has served as the Deputy Chief Minister II and State Minister of Housing and Local Government since 2023. He has served as the Member of Sabah State Legislative Assembly (MLA) for Kundasang since March 2004. He is a member of the United Sabah Party (PBS) which is aligned with the Perikatan Nasional (PN) coalition which rules both federally and in Sabah. He has served as the Deputy President of PBS for the non-Muslim bumiputera quota since June 2022.  Formerly, he also served as one of the Vice-Presidents of PBS for the non-Muslim bumiputera quota from 2006 to 2022.

Career 

He was appointed one of the deputy chief ministers of Sabah as part of the victorious Gabungan Rakyat Sabah coalition in the 2020 state election.

Election results

Honours 
 :
  Commander of the Order of Kinabalu (PGDK) – Datuk  (2012)
  Grand Commander of the Order of Kinabalu (SPDK) – Datuk Seri Panglima (2022)

References

Malaysian Christians
Kadazan-Dusun people
1958 births
Malaysian medical doctors
Malaysian Roman Catholics
Malaysian politicians
Living people